Neoscona nautica, the brown sailor spider, is a species of orb weaver in the family Araneidae. It is found in Asia and Pacific islands, has been introduced into both Americas, and Sudan.

References

External links

 

nautica
Articles created by Qbugbot
Spiders described in 1875